Falenica is a part of Wawer, one of districts of Warsaw, located on the right bank of the Vistula, in the far southeastern corner of the city. Until 1951 it was a separate village, then it became part of Warsaw. Before the Second World War Falenica, which is located in a forested area, was a favorite location for summer cottages and houses. Population of around 8.600 inhabitants.

World War II 
During World War II the Germans opened a Jewish ghetto there, called Falenica-Miedzeszyn Ghetto. All of its inhabitants were transported to Treblinka in August 1942. Falenica is located along the main rail line, which connects Warsaw with Lublin.

External links 
 Falenica Home Page and Forum - News, informations, forum, discussion about Falenica
  Falenica.pl  - first Falenica Home Page (rare updates)
 Jewish Community in Falenica at Virtual Shtetl

References

Neighbourhoods of Wawer
Holocaust locations in Poland